Moroni is a city in Sanpete County, Utah, United States. The population was 1,423 at the 2010 census.

Name
The city is named after Moroni, a prophet in the beliefs of the Church of Jesus Christ of Latter-day Saints (Mormons).

History
Moroni, Utah was founded by George Washington Bradley in 1859.  That same year George Washington Bradley became the bishop of Moroni and held that position for 18 years.

Geography

According to the United States Census Bureau, the city has a total area of 1.1 square miles (2.8 km2), all land.

Climate
This climatic region is typified by large seasonal temperature differences, with warm to hot summers and cold (sometimes severely cold) winters. In addition, the diurnal temperature variation is very large year-round. According to the Köppen climate classification system, Moroni has a humid continental climate, Dfb on climate maps, bordering a cold semi-arid climate (BSk).

Demographics

As of the census of 2000, there were 1,280 people, 399 households, and 316 families residing in the city. The population density was 1,194.1 people per square mile (461.9/km2). There were 430 housing units at an average density of 401.1 per square mile (155.2/km2). The racial makeup of the city was 82.58% White, 0.23% African American, 0.31% Native American, 0.08% Asian, 0.62% Pacific Islander, 12.03% from other races, and 4.14% from two or more races. Hispanic or Latino of any race were 20.55% of the population.

There were 399 households, out of which 46.4% had children under the age of 18 living with them, 68.2% were married couples living together, 8.0% had a female householder with no husband present, and 20.6% were non-families. 19.3% of all households were made up of individuals, and 14.3% had someone living alone who was 65 years of age or older. The average household size was 3.21 and the average family size was 3.70.

In the city, the population was spread out, with 35.5% under the age of 18, 10.2% from 18 to 24, 21.1% from 25 to 44, 20.2% from 45 to 64, and 13.0% who were 65 years of age or older. The median age was 28 years. For every 100 females, there were 100.3 males. For every 100 females age 18 and over, there were 93.9 males.

The median income for a household in the city was $32,375, and the median income for a family was $39,583. Males had a median income of $30,739 versus $21,875 for females. The per capita income for the city was $12,527. About 8.8% of families and 12.5% of the population were below the poverty line, including 14.2% of those under age 18 and 13.6% of those age 65 or over.

Education
Moroni is in the North Sanpete School District and has an elementary school and North Sanpete Middle School. Students attend North Sanpete High School in Mount Pleasant.

References

Cities in Utah
Cities in Sanpete County, Utah
Populated places established in 1859
1859 establishments in Utah Territory